Nathan Hales (born 16 June 1996) is a British sport shooter.

He participated at the 2019 World Shotgun Championships, where he won team bronze in the trap.

At the 2022 World Shotgun Championships, Hales earned a quota place for the 2024 Olympic Games when he won Silver in the Individual Men's Trap. He also won Silver in the Mixed Pairs Trap with Lucy Hall and Senior Men's Team Gold with Matthew Coward-Holley and Aaron Heading.

References

External links

Living people
1996 births
British male sport shooters
Trap and double trap shooters
20th-century British people
21st-century British people